Harry Hallworth "Hoge" Workman (September 25, 1899 – May 20, 1972) was a relief pitcher in Major League Baseball and a player-coach in the National Football League. Listed at 5' 11", 170 lb., Workman batted and threw right-handed. A native of Huntington, West Virginia, he attended Ohio State University.

A two-sport star at Ohio State and an All-American quarterback, Workman played briefly for the Boston Red Sox during the 1924 season. In 11 relief appearances, he posted an 8.50 ERA in 11 innings of work, including seven strikeouts, 11 walks, and 25 hits allowed without a decision or save.

Following his baseball career, Workman played and coached in the NFL for the Cleveland Bulldogs and Cleveland Indians, respectively.

Workman died at the age of 72 in Fort Myers, Florida.

"Workman Day"
Hoge was one of five Workman brothers to play football. They played in the same game during the "Workman Day" Celebration, which was held on November 27, 1920 in Huntington, West Virginia.

Head coaching record

College

References

External links
 
 
 

1899 births
1972 deaths
American football quarterbacks
Major League Baseball pitchers
Player-coaches
Boston Red Sox players
Mobile Bears players
Cleveland Bulldogs players
Cleveland Indians (NFL 1931) coaches
Cleveland Indians (NFL 1931) players
New York Giants players
Ohio State Buckeyes baseball players
Ohio State Buckeyes football players
Simpson Storm football coaches
Simpson Storm men's basketball coaches
Redlands Bulldogs football coaches
Sportspeople from Huntington, West Virginia
Players of American football from West Virginia
Baseball players from West Virginia